Chitobiosyldiphosphodolichol beta-mannosyltransferase is an enzyme that is encoded by ALG1 whose structure and function has been conserved from lower to higher organisms.

Function 

The biosynthesis of lipid-linked oligosaccharides is highly conserved among eukaryotes and is catalyzed by 14 glycosyltransferases in an ordered stepwise manner. The Alg1 mannosyltransferase I (MT I) catalyzes the first mannosylation step in this process.  Clinically, the deficiency of ALG1 in humans results in ALG1-CDG, a congenital disorder of glycosylation.

References

Further reading

External links
  GeneReviews/NCBI/NIH/UW entry on Congenital Disorders of Glycosylation Overview